Sabbagh is an Arabic surname that means to dye color. Notable people with the surname include:

Ali Sabbagh, a Lebanese football referee who has been a full international referee for FIFA since 2008
Dale Sabbagh, a South African rugby union player, currently playing with Border Super League side Old Selbornians
Dan Sabbagh, a British journalist who is the National News Editor of The Guardian
Georges Hanna Sabbagh, an Egyptian and French artist
Hasib Sabbagh, a Palestinian businessman, activist, and philanthropist
Hammouda Sabbagh, Syrian politician
Karl Sabbagh, a Palestinian-British writer, journalist and television producer
Mahmoud Sabbagh, a Saudi filmmaker, producer, and writer
Mustafa Sabbagh, Secretary-General of the National Coalition for Syrian Revolutionary and Opposition Forces
Pierre Sabbagh, a major personality in French television, as a journalist, producer and director
Salah al-Din al-Sabbagh, an Iraqi Army officer and Arab nationalist that led the Golden Square Nazis in the 1941 Iraqi coup d'état
Samir Sabbagh, founder of the Nasserist Unionists Movement, a minor Lebanese political party
Shaimaa al-Sabbagh, a 32-year-old woman whose death on camera perpetuated the post-coup unrest in Egypt (2013–2014)
Ziyad Sabbagh (born 1960), Syrian politician
Bassam al-Sabbagh, ambassador, permanent representative of Syria to the United Nations

Arabic-language surnames